Kozlov's long-eared bat (Plecotus kozlovi) is a species of vesper bat in the family Vespertilionidae. It is found in southern Mongolia and adjacent parts of China.

Taxonomy 
It was described by Nikolay Alekseyevich Bobrinski in 1926, but was later synonymized with the grey long-eared bat (P. austriacus). However, a 2006 genetic and morphological study found it to be a distinct species and revived it as such. The results of this study have been followed by the American Society of Mammalogists, the IUCN Red List, and the ITIS. Further genetic studies have affirmed it as a distinct species.

Distribution and habitat 
It is found in western and southern Mongolia and adjacent parts of China (Inner Mongolia, Xinjiang, and the Qaidam Basin in Qinghai). It is strongly associated with semidesert habitat, primarily steppe-desert. It likely roosts in cliff and rock crevices.

Status 
It is not thought to face any major threats at present, so it is classified as Least Concern on the IUCN Red List. However, it may be potentially threatened by commercial mining and agricultural land development.

References 

Plecotus
Bats of Asia
Mammals of Mongolia
Mammals of China
Mammals described in 1926